Gabriel is a family of sea skimming anti-ship missiles manufactured by Israel Aerospace Industries (IAI). The initial variant of the missile was developed in the 1960s in response to the needs of the Israeli Navy which first deployed it in 1970. Since then, variants have been exported to navies around the world. The latest variant, the Gabriel V, is in use by the Finnish and Israeli navies as of 2020.

Origin 
On October 21, 1967, four Styx missiles sank the destroyer INS Eilat, which was patrolling along the northern shores of the Sinai. Forty-seven Israeli sailors and officers were killed or went missing in action and 100 were injured. The loss of the ship prompted the Israeli Navy to ask Israel Aerospace Industries to accelerate the development of an anti-ship missile, which had begun in 1958 with the Luz (or Lutz) program.

Development

Faced with Rafael Advanced Defense Systems's anxiety to develop a new guidance system, Shlomo Erell asked Israel Aerospace Industries to take over the program by recruiting Ori Even-Tov, a former Rafael engineer. Even-Tov suggested dropping the guidance joystick approach used by the Luz, and instead proposed the development of an autonomous guidance system which would allow the missile to seek its objective, even in bad weather or bad visibility.
He further proposed using an altimeter, allowing the missile to fly some meters over the surface of the sea, making it difficult to detect and allowing it to hit the target just above the waterline. A radar installed on the ship had to guide the missile, while the altimeter would keep the missile in sea-skimming mode.

Gabriel Mk 1
The development of the Gabriel for the Israeli Navy began in 1962, before being first shown to the public in 1970. It was touted to be the world's first operational sea-skimming missile, and saw extensive action during the Yom Kippur War. A batch of 50 was imported by the Republic of China Navy for evaluation and as the interim weapon for the three Allen M. Sumner class destroyers upgraded with Gabriel Mk 2 missile system, and it is also the basis for the Taiwanese Hsiung Feng I missile.

Gabriel Mk 2
The Gabriel Mk 2, an improved version of Gabriel, was created in 1972 and entered service in 1976. It was also built under license in South Africa under the name Skerpioen (Afrikaans for Scorpion). The Taiwanese Hsiung Feng I missile can be considered as a parallel development, being based on Gabriel Mk 1 but with similar improvements, and ordnances used by the two systems are interchangeable.

Gabriel III
Gabriel III and Gabriel III A/S were introduced in 1978 with major improvements. The air-launched Gabriel III A/S has a range of over 60 km. Both Gabriel III versions employ the widely used 'fire and forget' mode.

Gabriel IV
Developed in the early 1990s is related to the Gabriel Mk III but larger and with a turbojet engine for sustained flight. It is distinguishable from the Mk III because of its swept wings with cropped tip. Like the Mk III, it has 3 guidance modes: Fire and Forget, Fire and Update with data link, and Fire and command using Radar update

Gabriel V
Israel Aerospace Industries is reportedly working on a Gabriel V Advanced Naval Attack Missile, with an advanced active multi-spectral seeker designed for cluttered littoral environments. As of 2020, this variant is deployed by the Finnish and Israeli navies. Range is claimed to be more than 200 km to 400 km.

Successful test firing of the Gabriel V was conducted by the Israel Defense Forces on September 21st 2022.

Blue Spear and Sea Serpent missile systems

In 2020, Israel's IAI and Singapore's ST Engineering started a 50/50 joint venture company called Proteus Advanced Systems to develop, produce and market a derivative of the Gabriel V called the Blue Spear missile system (Blue Spear). The missile has both sea and deep land attack capabilities with enhanced maneuverability for littoral environments. The warhead employs an active radar-homing seeker, accurate INS-based navigation capabilities, beyond-line-of-sight (BLOS) capability and a robust system which is immune to GPS disruptions and maximal accuracy target acquisition. The system is equipped with a variety of deception means to achieve its mission and cope with the different battle-field challenges. ST Engineering’s role in the Blue Spear’s development includes the design, development and production of major subsystems like the booster motor and warhead whilst IAI focuses on other parts. In 2021, IAI  and Thales jointly market a variant of Gabriel V or Blue Spear called Sea Serpent to the Royal Navy to replace its ageing Harpoon missile system. At DSEI 2021, IAI revealed that Sea Serpent is developed in parallel with the Blue Spear and based on the Gabriel V missile system and/or older variants. IAI added that Sea Serpent has a low profile mode or sea skimming range of greater than 290 km. This range corresponds with the overall Gabriel V's range of 200 km to 400 km, depending on flight profile. Hence, the Sea Serpent or Blue Spear missile can engage targets at distances of up to 400 km.

In October 2021, it was announced that the Estonian Defence Forces purchased the Blue Spear missile system with a maximum range of 290 km (flight profile not mentioned). It is also rumored that both Israel and Singapore already use variants of the Gabriel V which replaces their older Harpoon missiles. Blue Spear or Sea Serpent or Gabriel V allows both countries to conduct deep land, littoral and open sea surgical strikes effectively. On 13 May 2022, it was reported that Israel gave permission to Estonia to give Ukraine one Blue Spear 5G SSM rocket complex. However, the Estonian Minister of Defense dismissed the claims as false.

Older models
Older models of the Gabriel are still used by Chile (Sa'ar 4 with Gabriel II), Israel (Sa'ar 4.5 with Gabriel II), Mexico (Sa'ar 4.5 with Gabriel II), Sri Lanka (Sa'ar 4 with Gabriel II) and Thailand (FPB-45 with Gabriel I).

Operational history

During the Yom Kippur War the Gabriel I was used for the first time during the Battle of Latakia. Israeli missile boats armed with Gabriel Mk 1 missiles were credited with defeating Syrian ships armed with the Soviet-made P-15 Termit (SS-N-2 Styx) missile. Even though the Styx missile had a longer range, the Gabriel's reliability and flexibility of handling contributed to the Israeli victory.
It is known that the Syrians shot missile salvos at the charging Israeli vessels, but missed due to the Israeli ECM technology of the time. When they were in range, the Israeli boats launched their Gabriel missiles, and sank all but one Syrian Osa class ship, which was later sunk by cannon fire.
After defeating the Syrian Navy (surviving Syrian ships stayed in port) the Israeli missile boats defeated the Egyptian navy as well, achieving naval supremacy for the remainder of the war.

Details
During the Yom Kippur War in 1973, the Styx was shown to be far less effective than previously believed. From October 6 to October 12, 54 missiles were fired to no effect, according to Western sources. The aforementioned Russian sources however, claim that a total of seven ships were sunk - all small vessels such as trawlers, patrol boats, and missile boats. But the Russian specialists agreed with their Western counterparts that the overall results were unsatisfying, especially considering that seven Egyptian and Syrian vessels were sunk after being hit by Israeli Gabriel Mk.1 anti-ship missiles. This last figure is commonly recognized by specialists in both the West and East.

The first such encounter took place during the night of October 6 to October 7, 1973, near Latakia on the Syrian coast. Israeli forces used helicopters flying slowly at very low altitude, effectively simulating naval targets. No Israeli ship was hit by the large salvo of P-15s subsequently fired by the Syrians, who themselves lost the T-43 class trawler Jarmuk and three torpedo boats to Israeli Gabriel missiles. The Syrian missile boats withdrew successfully, but all of their missiles missed the Israeli helicopters, which had climbed to break the missile radars' locks. On the same night, a similar trick with helicopters was repeated against Egyptian ships north of the Sinai Peninsula. Yet another encounter took place near Latakia on the night of October 10–11. This time, the missile exchange between Israeli and Syrian missile boats took place without the use of helicopters, and Israeli ships relied on chaff. The Syrian vessels maneuvered outside their harbor among the anchored merchant ships. Two of the warships were sunk by Gabriel missiles, which also hit two neutral ships, the Greek Tsimentaros and the Japanese Yamashuro Maru. According to Israeli sources, the use of chaff saved all of its vessels. The following night, the helicopter maneuver was again successfully used during an encounter near Tartus off the Syrian coast. No Israeli ship was hit by a salvo of P-15s fired by Syrian missile boats. On the Syrian side, two Komar-class vessels were sunk by Gabriel missiles, and also the Soviet merchant ship Ilya Mechnikov was hit. On the same night, a similar encounter took place off the coast of Port Said.

Operators

Current operators

Azerbaijan Navy

Chilean Navy

Ecuadoran Navy

Eritrean Navy

Estonian Navy (Blue Spear 5G SSM)

Finnish Navy from 2019 onwards (Gabriel V)

Israeli Navy

Kenyan Navy

Mexican Navy

Sri Lankan Navy

Former operators

Republic of Singapore Navy

South African Navy

Republic of China Navy (Mk 2, reduced to reserve status due to service entry of the similar Hsiung Feng I missile and decommissioned in early 1990s)

Royal Thai Navy

See also
3M24
Exocet
Qader
SOM
Noor ASCM
Zafar
Khalij Fars
YJ-83

References

Anti-ship missiles
Guided missiles of Israel
IAI missiles
Military equipment introduced in the 1970s